Massachusetts House of Representatives' 1st Hampden district in the United States is one of 160 legislative districts included in the lower house of the Massachusetts General Court. It covers parts of Hampden County, Hampshire County, and Worcester County. Republican Todd Smola of Warren has represented the district since 2005.

Towns represented
The district includes the following localities:
 Brimfield
 Holland
 Palmer
 Sturbridge
 Wales
 part of Ware
 Warren

The current district geographic boundary overlaps with that of the Massachusetts Senate's Worcester, Hampden, Hampshire and Middlesex district.

Former locales
The district previously covered Monson, circa 1872.

Representatives
 John W. Foster, circa 1858 
 Paul W. Paige, circa 1859 
 Charles Henry Knox, circa 1888 
 Ernest Hobson, circa 1908
 John Hamilton, circa 1918
 Daniel W. O'Connor, circa 1920 
 Frank Smith, circa 1935
 Raymond H. Beach, circa 1951 
 Clarence B. Brown, circa 1951 
 George Smith, circa 1953
 Alexander Lolas, circa 1967
 John B. Perry, circa 1975 
 William Moriarty, circa 1986
 Patrick Landers, 1987–1999
 Reed V. Hillman, 1999–2005
 Todd M. Smola, 2005-current

See also
 List of Massachusetts House of Representatives elections
 Other Hampden County districts of the Massachusetts House of Representatives: 2nd, 3rd, 4th, 5th, 6th, 7th, 8th, 9th, 10th, 11th, 12th
 Hampden County districts of the Massachusett Senate: Berkshire, Hampshire, Franklin, and Hampden; Hampden; 1st Hampden and Hampshire; 2nd Hampden and Hampshire
 List of Massachusetts General Courts
 List of former districts of the Massachusetts House of Representatives

Images

References

External links

 Ballotpedia
  (State House district information based on U.S. Census Bureau's American Community Survey).

House
Government of Hampden County, Massachusetts
Government of Hampshire County, Massachusetts
Government in Worcester County, Massachusetts